Sardine v (or just Sardine) were an Australian post-punk band, formed in 1980 by Ian Rilen (X, Rose Tattoo) on guitar and vocals, and his then-wife, Stephanie Rilen (a.k.a. Stephanie Falconer) on lead vocals and keyboards. They issued a single, "Sabotage" (1982), and an extended play, I Hate You (1983). Other members included Johanna Pigott on bass guitar and Andrew Garton on saxophone. Sardine v disbanded in 1983.

History 

According to Ian Rilen, Sardine v formed in 1980 in Sydney after he bought a keyboard for his children and his then-wife Stephanie Rilen (now Falconer). Ian said: "I didn't know [Stephanie] played until I bought a keyboard for the kids and I was writing songs in my room at the house. She just walked by and played a line on the keyboard. I said, 'Do that again'. Fuck, that was really good."

With Ian on guitar and vocals and Stephanie on lead vocals and keyboards, Sardine v soon recruited Phil Hall (Dropbears, Lime Spiders) on bass guitar and Greg Skehill on drums. Their first show, at the Rockgarden on 13 December 1980, was a sell out, sharing the bill with Machinations, Love Mum, and the Urgent Ring Me's. An invitation, promotional card for the show was included in the Powerhouse Museum's "Real Wild Child" exhibition from 1994.

Sardine v were managed by SCAM (Suss City Artist Management), which also looked after the Sunnyboys, Machinations, Tablewaiters and Local Product. Lobby Loyde, part owner of SCAM, was co-producer on Sardine v's single, "Sabotage" (1981), with Damien Lovelock of the Celibate Rifles. 

Alan Lefebvre of Tharunka opined that it "starts off like another boring pop song – count to 8 and oh but it comes on like a speed rush... Through blurry eyes in the pits of a sleazy pub or early morning Manzil Room is where the 'Sabotage' started... Wonderful stuff, and pass the whisky laced speed, whilst we wait for the album!"

Although the band was popular live (playing to crowds of 800-1000), their music sales did not match this. 

A music video of Sardine performing "Sudan" was broadcast on ABC-TV's pop music show, Countdown and showed Ian Rilen on guitar, Stephanie Rilen on keyboards and lead vocals, Johanna Pigott on bass guitar, and Barton Price on drums. 

After the group broke up in 1983, Ian Rilen went back to playing with X. Clinton Walker later recalled that they were "inner city modern and looked like a million bucks with Ian in a powder blue suit and his hair all slicked back like a gangster and Steph in an evening gown, but it just fizzled out."

Hunters & Collectors covered their track, "Stuck on You" (written by I Rilen, S Falconer), on their 1986 album Human Frailty and added it to their set. Mark Seymour of Hunters & Collectors described the track "A Darlinghurst love triangle. Sardine V, the band... first witnessed at the Trade Union Club, 1983."

Stephanie Rilen later married Doug Falconer, the drummer of that band. Both tracks from the single appeared on compilation albums by various artists. The Deadly Hume covered "I Hate You" on the Phantom Records tenth anniversary compilation, Assorted Desecrations and Magnificent Mutations (1988).

Members

Ian Rilen – guitar, vocals (1980–83)
Stephanie Rilen – keyboard, vocals (1980–83)
Phil Hall – bass (1980–82)
Greg Skehill – drums (1980–81)
Michael Skinner - drums (1981)
Barton Price – drums (1981–82)
Johanna Pigott – bass (1982)
John Lloyd – drums (1982)
Stuart Dunlop – bass (1982–83)
Andrew Garton – sax (1983)
Craig Rossi – drums (1983)

Discography

 "Sabotage"/"Sudan" 7" single (White Label Records, 1982) – produced by Lobby Loyde
I Hate You mini-LP (Phantom PH-18, 1983)
"Stuck on You" (track on Fast Forward FF008/009, 1982)
"Sabotage" (track on The Mushroom Story: The Hits of the Eighties Vol 2, Mushroom MUSH33136.2, 1998)
"Sudan" (track on Tales from the Australian Underground: Singles 1976-1989, 2003)

References

External links
Hunters & Collectors: "Stuck On You" (lyrics)

New South Wales musical groups